Joe Tarrod Bowden, III (born February 25, 1970) is a former American football linebacker in the National Football League for the Houston Oilers / Tennessee Oilers / Tennessee Titans and Dallas Cowboys. He played college football at the University of Oklahoma.

Early years
Bowden attended North Mesquite High School in Mesquite, Texas, where he received All-American and All-state recognition. He accepted a football scholarship from the University of Oklahoma. He didn't play in his first year because of failing to meet the requirements of Proposition 48.

As a junior in 1990, he led the team in tackles with 116 (3 for loss), while making one interception, 4 passes defensed, one forced fumble and one fumble recovery. He gained All-American honors as a senior, while registering 127 tackles, 2 sacks and 2 interceptions (both returned for touchdowns). He finished his college career with 286 tackles (168 solo), 2 sacks, 3 interceptions, 6 passes defensed, 3 fumble recoveries and 2 forced fumbles.

Professional career

Houston Oilers / Tennessee Oilers / Tennessee Titans
Bowden was selected by the Houston Oilers in the fifth round (133rd overall) of the 1992 NFL draft. As a rookie, he played 14 games on special teams, making 9 tackles (seventh on the team).

In 1993, he started 6 games after replacing an injured Wilber Marshall at right linebacker. He registered 28 tackles, one sack, one pass defensed one fumble recovery and 7 special teams tackles.

In 1994, he missed the first 2 games with a quadricep injury. He started one game at left linebacker in place of an injured Eddie Robinson. He collected 13 tackles, one forced fumble and 7 special teams tackles.

In 1995, Michael Barrow moved to middle linebacker to replace an injured Al Smith, opening the door for Bowden to start 14 games at right linebacker. He posted 51 tackles, 2 passes defensed, 4 forced fumbles (led the team) and 5 special teams tackles.

In 1996, he started 16 games at left linebacker, making 73 tackles (fifth on the team), 3 sacks, 6 passes defensed and 2 forced fumbles.

In 1997, he started 16 games at left linebacker. In the season finale against the Pittsburgh Steelers, he suffered a broken left fibula. He tallied 84 tackles (second on the team), 2.5 sacks, one interception, 4 passes defensed one forced fumble and one special teams tackle.

In 1998, with the signing of Robinson, he took over the middle linebacker starting position, replacing Barron Wortham. He recorded 145 tackles (led the team), 1.5 sacks, 6 quarterback pressures, 3 passes defended, one interception and 2 fumble recoveries.

In 1999, Wortham regained his starting position and Bowden moved to left linebacker, during the Super Bowl XXXIV run. He registered 15 starts, 81 tackles, 3.5 sacks, 3 forced fumbles, 3 fumble recoveries and one interception.

Following the signing of Randall Godfrey in free agency and the drafting of Keith Bullock, Bowden became expendable and was not re-signed. He left after starting 84 of 123 regular-season games, while missing only 5 games and registering 521 tackles.

Dallas Cowboys
On May 3, 2000, the Dallas Cowboys had a lot of turnover at the linebacker position and the signing of Bowden in free agency was one of the moves made to improve the depth. He was the backup to Darren Hambrick and played in all 16 games, making 46 tackles, 2 tackles for loss and 2 special teams tackles. He was cut on April 20, 2001, after failing a physical. In his career he only missed 5 of 139 games.

Coaching career
From 2008 to 2011, Bowden held coaching positions at Oklahoma City high schools: Mount St. Mary High School and Edmond Santa Fe High School.

In 2006, Bowden was hired as the secondary coach for the Central Oklahoma Bronchos. He held this position until 2008.

In 2012, Bowden was hired by the St. Louis Rams to become an assistant linebackers coach, reuniting with Jeff Fisher who was his head coach with the Titans. On March 1, 2016, he was moved to assistant special teams coach, before leaving the team on March 17, for a job at a higher position.

On March 17, 2016, Bowden was hired by the San Francisco 49ers. He was appointed to the position of inside linebackers coach after Hardy Nickerson (who was hired in January ) abruptly quit and took a job as the Illinois defensive coordinator for his former coaching companion Lovie Smith who was also just hired by the Illini.

In 2017, he was hired as the defensive coordinator and linebackers coach for the Missouri Baptist University.

Personal life
In 1998, he married Malika (Welch) and they have two daughters, Sydney and Cheyenne. He has one son, Jaylon who also plays football and is following in the footsteps of his father.

References

External links
 Tennessee State profile

1970 births
Living people
American football linebackers
Central Oklahoma Bronchos football coaches
Dallas Cowboys players
Houston Oilers players
Missouri Baptist Spartans football coaches
Oklahoma Sooners football players
San Francisco 49ers coaches
St. Louis Rams coaches
Tennessee Oilers players
Tennessee State Tigers football coaches
Tennessee Titans players
High school football coaches in Oklahoma
Sportspeople from Dallas
People from Mesquite, Texas
Coaches of American football from Texas
Players of American football from Dallas
African-American coaches of American football
African-American players of American football
21st-century African-American sportspeople
20th-century African-American sportspeople